Madeleine Mantock (born 26 May 1990) is a British actress. She is known for her main role television work on the series Into the Badlands and a remake of the series The Tomorrow People. She played in a main role as Macy Vaughn from the reboot of Charmed from 2018 to 2021 on The CW. She appeared in The Long Song as Miss Clara in a supporting role.

Early life and education
Mantock is of “Afro-Caribbean and Caucasian” heritage. She attended Arts Educational Schools, London where she obtained her BA in Musical Theatre.

Career
Mantock primarily works in television, starring as main character Scarlett Conway in Casualty, before she graduated drama school. She was part of the series for 36 episodes from 2011 to 2012. She then appeared on Lee Nelson's Well Funny People in 2013, before moving to the United States to be a main character, Astrid, on The Tomorrow People, which was canceled after one season. She then played the small role of Julie in the film, Edge of Tomorrow. In 2015 she was cast in a main role, Veil, on AMC's Into the Badlands. Her character for Into the Badlands has received positive response.

Mantock then had a role in the 2017 film, Breaking Brooklyn, and filmed her main role in Age Before Beauty. In March 2018, she was cast in the lead role of Macy Vaughn in The CW's fantasy drama series Charmed, a reboot of the 1998 series of the same name. The reboot centers on three sisters in a college town who discover they are witches. In July 2021, Mantock announced that she would be departing Charmed before the airing of the third season finale.

She also appeared in the supporting role of Miss Clara in the 2018 BBC adaptation of Andrea Levy's novel The Long Song, set in nineteenth century colonial Jamaica.

Filmography

References

External links
 
 
 

1990 births
Actors from Nottingham
Black British actresses
English film actresses
English people of Barbadian descent
English television actresses
Living people
People educated at the Arts Educational Schools
21st-century English actresses